The 2018 Armed Forces Bowl was a college football bowl game played on December 22, 2018. It was the 16th edition of the Armed Forces Bowl, and one of the 2018–19 bowl games concluding the 2018 FBS football season. Sponsored by aerospace and defense company Lockheed Martin, the game was officially known as the Lockheed Martin Armed Forces Bowl.  On December 18, it was announced that the game had officially sold out of tickets, the first such sellout in the Armed Forces Bowl's 16-year history.

Army's 70–14 victory tied the then largest margin of victory in a bowl game, 56, set by Tulsa in the 2008 GMAC Bowl when they defeated Bowling Green 63–7. Army's 70 points tied the record for most points in an FBS bowl game, set by West Virginia in the 2012 Orange Bowl, when they defeated Clemson 70–33. The then-tied record of largest margin of victory in a bowl game would go on to be broken in the 2023 National Championship game, where Georgia would defeat TCU by a final score of 65–7.

Teams
The bowl originally planned to invite teams from the Big 12 Conference and the American Athletic Conference (The American). When fourth-ranked Oklahoma was selected for the College Football Playoff, a Big 12 bowl tie-in was left open. Army, an FBS Independent, was selected to fill this opening, facing off with The American member Houston.

Army Black Knights

Army received and accepted a bid to the Armed Forces Bowl on December 2. The Black Knights subsequently won the Army–Navy Game on December 8, and entered the bowl with a 10–2 record.

Houston Cougars

Houston received and accepted a bid to the Armed Forces Bowl on December 2. The Cougars entered the bowl with a 8–4 record (5–3 in conference).

Game summary

Scoring summary

Statistics

Records set or tied
NCAA FBS
Margin of victory in a bowl game (tied): 56 points by Army (tied with Tulsa in its 63–7 win over Bowling Green in the 2008 GMAC Bowl)
Most points scored by a single team in a bowl game (tied): 70 points by Army (tied with West Virginia in its 70–33 win over Clemson in the 2012 Orange Bowl)

Armed Forces Bowl
Most points scored: 70, Army vs. Houston
Largest margin of victory: 56, Army vs. Houston
Most team total yards: 592, Army vs. Houston
Most team rushing yards: 507, Army vs. Houston
Most team sacks: 10, Army vs. Houston
Most rushing touchdowns by an individual: 5, by Kelvin Hopkins Jr. of Army
Most sacks by an individual: 3.5, by James Nachtigal of Army
Largest attendance of Armed Forces Bowl Game: 44,738

Army (football program)
 Most wins in a season: 11
 Most rushing TDs by an individual in a game (tied): 5 by Kelvin Hopkins Jr.
 Most rushing TDs by an individual in a season (tied): 17 by Kelvin Hopkins Jr.
 Most TDs responsible for by an individual in a season (tied): 23 (6 passing, 17 rushing) by Kelvin Hopkins Jr.
 Total offense by an individual in a season: 2,143 yards (1,026 passing, 1,117 rushing) by Kelvin Hopkins Jr.

References

External links

Box score at ESPN

Armed Forces Bowl
Armed Forces Bowl
Armed Forces Bowl
Armed Forces Bowl
Army Black Knights football bowl games
Houston Cougars football bowl games